Termitotroginae is a monotypic subfamily of the family Scarabaeidae, the scarab beetles. The only genus in the subfamily is Termititrox. A second genus, Aphodiocopris, Arrow, 1920, has been synonymised with Termitotrox. All known members of this subfamily are tiny, blind and flightless, and dwell within the fungal gardens of colonies of species of termite in Africa or tropical Asia.

Termitotrogins are characterised by having no eyes and no wings, and their pronotum and elytra have a distinctive patterning of ribs and grooves. The function of the beetles in the termite colony is unclear but it seems that they are likely to be obligatory termitophiles and somehow play an important role in the nest environment of their fungus-growing hosts.

Species
The following species are included in the genus Termitotrox:

Termitotrox ancoroides  (Petrovitz, 1956) – Eastern Democratic Republic of the Congo
Termitotrox consobrinus Reichensperger, 1915 – Republic of South Africa and KwazuluNatal
Termitotrox cupido Maruyama, 2012 - Cambodia 
Termitotrox kenyensis Paulian, 1985 – Kenya
Termitotrox maynei Reichensperger, 1956 – Eastern Democratic Republic of the Congo
Termitotrox minutus (Arrow, 1920) – India
Termitotrox monodi Paulian, 1947 – Ivory Coast
Termitotrox permirus Wasmann, 1918 – India
Termitotrox turkanicus Krikken, 2008 – Kenya
Termitotrox usambaricus Krikken, 2008 – Tanzania
Termitotrox vanbruggeni Krikken, 2008 – Kenya

References

Beetle subfamilies
Scarabaeidae